The 2003 European Race Walking Cup was held in Cheboksary, Russia, on May 17–18, 2003.

Complete results were published.  Medal winners were published on the Athletics Weekly website,

Medallists

Results

Men's 20 km

Team (20 km Men)

Men's 50 km

Team (50 km Men)

Men's 10 km (Junior)

Team (10 km Junior Men)

Women's 20 km

Team (20 km Women)

Women's 10 km Junior

Team (10 km Junior Women)

Participation
The participation of 244 athletes (158 men/86 women) from 27 countries is reported.

 (2)
 (15)
 (6)
 (2)
 (3)
 (16)
 (15)
 (10)
 (6)
 (8)
 (17)
 (11)
 (13)
 (5)
 (5)
 (8)
 (11)
 (6)
 (18)
 (7)
 (18)
 (5)
 (6)
 (4)
 (16)
 (7)
 (4)

References

European Race Walking Cup
European Race Walking Cup
International athletics competitions hosted by Russia
European Race Walking Cup
May 2003 sports events in Russia